Melissa Ann Melendez (née Schneider; born February 17, 1968) is an American politician who served in the California State Senate. She is a Republican that represented the 28th District, which encompassed large portions of Riverside County. She previously served in the California State Assembly and on the Lake Elsinore City Council.

Early life
Melendez is a native of Youngstown, Ohio. After high school, she enlisted in the United States Navy. She attended the Defense Language Institute in Monterey, California, where she learned Russian.

While serving in the Navy, Melendez also attended college in the evenings, and received her BA in History and Political Studies from the Chaminade University of Honolulu in Honolulu, Hawaii.

Career
Melendez was one of the first women to fly aboard EP-3 aircraft overseas. She was a Russian language translator for ten years, and was part of flight missions during Operation Desert Shield and Desert Storm.

After the Navy, Melendez worked at Chaminade University for two years before deciding to establish her own business. She then formed a transcription company, contracting with the Navy. Melendez earned her MBA from the University of Phoenix in June 2008. In 2008, Melendez was elected to the Lake Elsinore City Council. She served as Mayor Pro Tem as well as Mayor during her four years in local government.

After incumbent State Senator Jeff Stone announced his resignation to work as a regional director at the U.S. Department of Labor, a special election was ordered to fill his vacant seat. After advancing in the March 3, 2020, special election, Melendez won the runoff election held on May 12 over the Democratic nominee, Riverside County School Board Trustee Elizabeth Romero and was sworn into the Senate on May 18.

The day after the 2020 United States presidential election, prior to a winner being declared, she claimed that Democrats were attempting to steal the election.

Electoral history

2020 California State Senate

2018 California State Assembly

2016 California State Assembly

2014 California State Assembly

2012 California State Assembly

References

External links 
 
 Campaign website
 
 Join California Melissa Melendez
 

Republican Party members of the California State Assembly
Living people
Female United States Navy personnel
Women state legislators in California
Politicians from Youngstown, Ohio
California city council members
Mayors of places in California
Chaminade University of Honolulu alumni
People from Lake Elsinore, California
Women city councillors in California
21st-century American politicians
1968 births
21st-century American women politicians
Women mayors of places in California